Revolution of Trujillo was a social and political conflict in Peru which began in Trujillo city on July 6, 1932. It started with an uprising led by Manuel Barreto (known as "Buffalo"), against President Luis Miguel Sánchez Cerro.

History
On January 8, 1932, President of Peru Luis Sanchez Cerro carried out an "autocoup" by outlawing political liberties and allowing for citizens to be detained without a warrant.  It was the combination of this action, social inequalities and violations of sugar plantation workers labor rights which led to further civil unrest. Additionally, the party showed little interest in the indigenous peasants.

On the dawn of July 7, 1932, an insurgent group composed mainly of peasants and workers, led by Manuel Barreto, attacked and captured the artillery barrack Ricardo O'Donovan, located at the former entrance to the city. In this assault, Barreto was one of the first to fall afflicted. The headquarters were ransacked. The weapons (including six mobile guns, rifles and machine guns) were distributed among the insurgents. In the morning, the city was taken by the people. Rebel Don Agustín Haya de la Torre (brother Víctor Raúl Haya de la Torre) was appointed Prefect (highest civil authority). The districts bordering the city also joined the insurrection.

The Executions
Many of the fighters who had surrendered were shot without trial. A "Court Martial" with no warranties and independence issued the death penalty against 102 people accused of being primarily responsible for the uprising. Because many of these people were fugitives and others had died in the clash, the penalty could only be applied to 42 detainees. They were led to the citadel of Chan Chan, and were forced to dig trenches that would become their graves.  They were shot on July 27, 1932.

See also
Trujillo
Víctor Raúl Haya de la Torre

References

1932 in Peru
20th-century revolutions
History of Trujillo, Peru
Conflicts in 1932